Albert Gleaves (January 1, 1858 – January 6, 1937) was a decorated admiral in the United States Navy, also notable as a naval historian.

Biography
Born in Nashville, Tennessee, Gleaves graduated from the United States Naval Academy in 1877. Assigned to many ships and stations, he commanded  during the Spanish–American War and later the battleship . Promoted to rear admiral in 1915, in World War I he commanded the Cruiser and Transport Force. For his outstanding contribution he was awarded the Army and Navy Distinguished Service Medals.

In 1919 he was promoted to Admiral and commanded the Asiatic Fleet. While serving at the Naval Ordnance Proving Ground, Admiral Gleaves made outstanding contributions in the field of gunnery and torpedoes. While carrying out some tests on torpedo steering devices he changed these weapons from instruments of luck into instruments of precision. The gear which he tested in Cushing provided the imprints which made the torpedo the "terrible weapon" of World War I.

In spite of a life of constant action in war and peace, he found time to write a biography of Captain James Lawrence; A History of the Transport Service, and The Life of an American Sailor: Rear Admiral William Hemsley Emory, United States Navy, from His Letters and Memoirs. After a most distinguished career, he retired on January 1, 1922.

He was a companion of the Naval Order of the United States and was assigned insignia number 756.

Admiral Gleaves died at Haverford, Pennsylvania, January 6, 1937, a few days after his 79th birthday.

He has been quoted as saying, "To seamen a ship becomes endowed with human virtues and faults; she ceases to be a mere inanimate thing."

There was a statue of Admiral Gleaves at the State Capitol in Nashville, Tennessee. The statue was moved to the Tennessee State Museum to be included in a military exhibit.

Decorations
Here is Admiral Albert Gleaves's ribbon bar:

Namesake

Gallery

See also

References

His memoirs, titled The Admiral: the Memoirs of Albert Gleaves, Admiral, USN, was published in 1985 by Hope Publishing House, Pasadena, California (HOPE ).

External links
Arlington National Cemetery

1858 births
1937 deaths
People from Nashville, Tennessee
United States Naval Academy alumni
United States Navy admirals
American naval historians
American male non-fiction writers
United States Navy personnel of the Spanish–American War
United States Navy personnel of World War I
Recipients of the Navy Distinguished Service Medal
Recipients of the Distinguished Service Medal (US Army)
Commandeurs of the Légion d'honneur
Recipients of the Order of the Sacred Treasure, 1st class
Burials at Arlington National Cemetery
20th-century American historians